Lohara is a village in Balapur  tehsil, Akola district Maharashtra  in the India. It belongs to the Vidarbha region of Amravati Division.

Location
Located 30 away from Akola District, 9 km away from  Shegaon,   
Pin code of Lohara is 444311

Location in Wikimapia.

Demographics
Marathi, Hindi and Urdu are the local languages. 7504  population of Lohara,

Transport

Road
Lohara is 9 km away from Shegaon toward AKOT Road. Shegaon is the nearest town with railway station, around 9 km from Lohara.

Rail
Akola Jn Railway Station is major railway station 30 km near to Lohara. Shegaon Railway Station is nearest railway station, from Akola trains run more frequently.

Schools
Zilla Parishad Marathi Medium School
Zilla Parishad Urdu Middle School
Smt.Radhabai Bakal Vidyalaya
Mastaniya Urdu High School
Madrasa Banatus Salehat (Arabi Education)
Hawwabai Girls Urdu School & Junior College

References 

Cities and towns in Akola district